Forest Springs may refer to:

Forest Springs, Nevada County, California
Forest Springs, Santa Cruz County, California
Forest Springs, Missouri